Nocupétaro is a municipality in the Mexican state of Michoacán, located approximately  south of the state capital of Morelia.

Geography
It borders the municipalities of Madero to the north, Carácuaro to the east, Turicato to the southwest, and Tacámbaro to the northwest.

As of 2009, the land cover in Nocupétaro consists of tropical forest (59%), grassland (19%) and temperate forest (14%). Another 7% of the land is used for agriculture and 0.6% consists of urban areas. Nocupétaro is located in the drainage basin of the Tacámbaro River, a tributary of the Balsas River.

Most of Nocupétaro has a tropical wet and dry climate with rain in the summer, while the southernmost portion of the municipality has a semi-arid climate.

History
Nocupétaro has been inhabited since pre-Hispanic times. The name is of Chichimeca origin and means "place in the valley". José María Morelos served as parish priest of Carácuaro and Nocupétaro from 1799 until 1810, when he joined the rebels in the Mexican War of Independence. In 1822, Nocupétaro was made part of the partido of Tacámbaro. It became an independent municipality in 1910.

Administration
The municipal government of Nocupétaro comprises a president, a councillor (Spanish: síndico), and seven trustees (regidores), four elected by relative majority and three by proportional representation. The current president of the municipality is J. Félix González Gómez.

Demographics
In the 2010 Mexican Census, the municipality of Nocupétaro recorded a population of 7799 inhabitants living in 1858 households. The 2015 Intercensal Survey estimated a population of 8195 inhabitants in Nocupétaro.

There are 142 localities in the municipality, of which only the municipal seat Nocupétaro de Morelos is classified as urban. It recorded a population of 3260 inhabitants in the 2010 Census.

Economy
Nocupétaro is one of the poorest municipalities in Michoacán. As of 2017, half of its population lived in extreme poverty. Agriculture is the main economic activity in the municipality. The main crops are corn, sorghum, beans and squash, and livestock such as goats, pigs, cattle and poultry are raised.

References

Municipalities of Michoacán
1910 establishments in Mexico
States and territories established in 1910